Son of Saul is a 2015 Hungarian historical drama film directed by László Nemes, in his feature directorial debut, and co-written by Nemes and Clara Royer. It is set in the Auschwitz concentration camp during World War II, and follows a day-and-a-half in the life of Saul Ausländer (played by Géza Röhrig), a Hungarian member of the Sonderkommando.

The film premiered at the 2015 Cannes Film Festival, where it won the Grand Prix. It was also shown in the Special Presentations section of the 2015 Toronto International Film Festival. The film won the award for Best Foreign Language Film at the 88th Academy Awards. It is the ninth Hungarian film to be nominated for the award, and the first since István Szabó's Hanussen in 1988. It is the second Hungarian film to win the award, the first being Szabó's Mephisto in 1981. It also won the Golden Globe for Best Foreign Language Film, becoming the first Hungarian film to win the award.

Plot
In October 1944, Saul Ausländer works as a Sonderkommando Jewish–Hungarian prisoner in Auschwitz. His job is to salvage valuables from the clothing of corpses, drag them from the gas chambers and scrub the gas chambers before the next group of victims arrives to be murdered. He works stoically, seemingly having been numbed by the daily attrocities. Among the dead after a gassing, Saul sees a boy who is still barely alive suffocated by a Nazi doctor who calls for an autopsy on the boy. Saul steps forth and insists on carrying the body himself to the prison doctor, Miklós Nyiszli, a fellow Hungarian prisoner and a forced assistant to Josef Mengele. He asks Miklós to not cut up the boy, so he can give him a proper Jewish burial. Miklós declines, but says he can have five minutes alone with the boy tonight, before the cremation. Saul goes in search of a Rabbi to perform the funeral ritual. He goes to Rabbi Frankel in the crematorium, who dismisses Saul's concern and suggests that Saul perform the burial himself.

Saul overhears Sonderkommando Abraham talk about an uprising against the SS-guards with Oberkapo Biederman (Urs Rechn). Biederman first wants to photograph the camp's horrors using a camera collected from the clothing of an earlier murdered caravan, and smuggle the pictures outside to attract attention and help. Saul asks for another rabbi and Abraham tells him of "the Renegade," a Greek Rabbi who has lost his faith. Saul in return offers his assistance in their plan and is instructed to go with a prisoner (Katz) to repair a shack; he is given a piece of jewellery for use as a bribe in case he's caught. When Saul and Katz arrive at the shack, Saul pretends to fix the front door's lock, while Katz takes out a camera from inside the shack and starts to take pictures of the cremation. Saul hears the guards and hides the camera outside in a drain. The guards search the shack, only to find nothing.

Saul then sneaks onto a truck for another Sonderkommando unit, heading to a nearby riverbank, where the ashes from the crematoria are dumped into the river. Saul finds the Renegade, who refuses to help him. Saul then threatens to alert the Oberkapo of the unit, Mietek, that the Renegade is a rabbi by reciting a Jewish blessing. When the Renegade refuses yet again Saul throws the man's shovel into the water. The rabbi jumps into the river to retrieve the shovel or drown himself. Saul, who can't swim, manages to bring the Renegade back to the riverbank and both are then taken to the SS-commandant of the unit. After an interrogation, the Renegade is executed and Saul is allowed to go back to the unit.

Saul is then confronted by Mietek, who realizes that he is from another unit. To mollify Mietek, Saul gives him the piece of jewellery. Back at the concentration camp, following roll call, Saul sneaks into Miklós's office where he is caught by a group of Nazi officers. One of them pushes Saul around like a puppet and makes a mockery of Jewish dances, finally forcing him out of the room. After searching in vain for the boy's body, Saul confronts Miklós, who assures him that he has hidden it from the other doctors for safety. Saul sneaks into the autopsy room and takes the body back to his own barrack in a sack.

That night, Saul is summoned to clean the dinner tables by SS-commandant Moll. Biederman walks in and is ordered to write up a list of seventy names. This leads Biederman to believe that his unit will soon be killed. Biederman discloses the information to Abraham, who instructs Saul to head to the women's camp, where he will pick up a smuggled package of gunpowder from a prisoner named Ella. When Saul finds himself face to face with Ella, it is clear they know each other. She calls him by name and clasps his hand, but he withdraws. After collecting the package, Saul deliberately falls into a line of newly arrived Hungarian Jews, who are being led into the woods for execution. Saul, again, looks for a rabbi among the arrivals. A Frenchman named Braun approaches him and convinces Saul that he is a rabbi. Saul disguises Braun as a member of the Sonderkommando and sneaks him into the camp. When Saul arrives at the camp he is confronted by Abraham and realizes that during the turmoil in the woods he has lost the package. On further questioning, he says that the murdered boy is his illegitimate son, an assertion Abraham says is not true.

The next morning during roll call, Miklós finds Saul and tells him that he needs a replacement body, similar to the one Saul has taken. The prisoners are then summoned into the crematorium to get back to work, where they discover that Biederman and his unit have been murdered by the SS. Abraham starts a riot with the other prisoners and they attack the SS guards, starting the rebellion. After managing to escape from the crematorium, Saul retrieves the boy's corpse and escapes to the woods with Braun and few other prisoners. When they reach a river, Saul finds a chance to bury the body, only to discover that Braun is a fraud when he can't recite the Kaddish. When he hears the guards approaching, Saul tries to carry the body across the river. Unable to manage the current with the added weight, he loses his grasp on the sack and is pulled out of the river by Rabbi Frankel as the corpse floats away. When the prisoners arrive at a shed in the forest, they start to discuss a plan to join the Polish resistance. Saul notices a young peasant boy peeking into the shed and smiles at him, the only time he is shown with a smile. The boy runs away, and makes it a short distance before an SS officer grabs and silences him as guards run past in the direction of the shed. When they have all passed, the officer releases him, and the boy runs into the woods as the sound of gunfire echoes behind him.

Cast

Production

Development
Nemes conceived of the film from the book The Scrolls of Auschwitz, a collection of testimonies by Sonderkommando members, after discovering it during the production of Béla Tarr's The Man from London in 2005 when he was working as Tarr's assistant. Nemes started working on the screenplay with Royer in 2010 and completed the first draft in 2011. The writers spent several years on research, while historians such as Gideon Greif, Philippe Mesnard and Zoltán Vági provided support for the film.

The project struggled to find financial backers due to the film's unconventional approach and Nemes's lack of experience in directing a feature film. Originally intended to be a French production with a French protagonist, the film was produced entirely in Hungary. After potential co-production partners in France, Israel, Germany and Austria turned down the project, the €1.5 million budget was ultimately covered by the Hungarian National Film Fund, Hungarian tax credits and the Claims Conference, accounting respectively for 70%, 25% and 5%.

Casting
Nemes insisted on casting actors who spoke their characters' own languages. New York City-based Hungarian poet Géza Röhrig, who had not acted in film since the 1980s, was cast as the main character, Saul, after being considered originally for a supporting role.

Filming
The film was shot on 35 mm film in 28 days in Budafok, Budapest. A 40 mm lens and the Academy aspect ratio of 1.375:1 were adopted to realise shallow focus and a portrait-like narrow field of vision.

Architect and liberal activist László Rajk, who also worked on the permanent Hungarian exhibition at the Auschwitz-Birkenau State Museum, designed the re-creation of the crematoria.

Post-production
The film took five months of sound design. Human voices in eight languages were recorded and attached to the original recording of the production. Sound designer Tamás Zányi described the sound in the film "as a sort of acoustic counterpoint to the intentionally narrowed imagery". The film is composed of 85 shots.

Release
The film premiered in competition at the 68th Cannes Film Festival on 15 May 2015, where it won the Grand Prix. The filmmakers initially tried to premiere the film at the 65th Berlin International Film Festival, but after the festival offered them a spot only in the Panorama section, not in the main competition, they decided to refuse the proposal and instead aim for the Cannes competition.

In Hungary, the film was released on 11 June 2015 and sold more than 220,000 tickets, placing it as the highest-grossing domestic film released since the slapstick comedy Üvegtigris 3 in 2010.

Reception
Upon its release at Cannes, the film was met with critical acclaim. On the review aggregation website Rotten Tomatoes, the film has an approval rating of 96% based on reviews from 229 critics, with an average rating of 8.90/10. The site's critical consensus reads, "Grimly intense yet thoroughly rewarding, Son of Saul offers an unforgettable viewing experience – and establishes director László Nemes as a talent to watch". On Metacritic, the film has a score of 90 out of 100, based on reviews from 47 critics, indicating "universal acclaim".

In his review for The Guardian, Peter Bradshaw rated the film five out of five stars, calling it an "astonishing debut film" and "a horror movie of extraordinary focus and courage". He ended his review writing: "Nemes's film has found a way to create a fictional drama with a gaunt, fierce kind of courage...." Writing for Time Out, Dave Calhoun also gave the film five out of five stars. Indiewires Eric Kohn awarded the film an A− rating, calling it "a remarkable refashioning of the Holocaust drama that reignites the setting with extraordinary immediacy". In his review written for The Hollywood Reporter, Boyd van Hoeij praised the cinematography and the soundwork of the film. He writes: "Shot (and shown in Cannes) on 35mm, often in sickly greens and yellows and with deep shadows, Erdely's cinematography is one of the film's major assets, but it wouldn't be half as effective without the soundwork, which plays a major role in suggesting what is happening around Saul, with audiences often forced to rely on the sound to imagine the whole, horrible picture". Writing for The Film Stage, Giovanni Marchini Camia gave the film an A rating, and called it "a towering landmark for filmic fictionalizations of the Holocaust". A.A. Dowd of The A.V. Club gave the film an A− rating, and praised the movie's unique perspective: "Son of Saul is the rare Holocaust drama that finds actual drama, and not just despair, in the living hell of a concentration camp". [...] "Son of Saul sees humanity in effort, identity in action; it watches someone with nothing, a man reduced to a statistic, get a piece of himself back, mostly by finding some meaning in a place of meaningless evil".

Claude Lanzmann, director of the documentary Shoah, gave the film high praise, stating that "it's a very new film, very original, very unusual. It's a film that gives a very real sense of what it was like to be in the Sonderkommando. It's not at all melodramatic. It's done with a very great modesty". Philosopher Georges Didi-Huberman also praised the film, and he wrote a 25-page open letter to Nemes, which opened with "Your film, ‘Son of Saul,' is a monster. A necessary, coherent, beneficial, innocent monster".

Nemes was questioned about the similarities between Son of Saul and the 2001 film The Grey Zone, with Nemes replying "But mine is an Anti-Grey Zone!"

In a 2016 BBC poll, critics voted the film the 34th greatest since 2000.

In 2019, The Guardian critics ranked the film 12th in its Best Films of the 21st Century list.

Accolades
At the Cannes Film Festival the film won the Grand Prix and the FIPRESCI Prize in the main competition section. The film also won the François Chalais Prize and the Vulcan Award. At the 88th Academy Awards, Son of Saul won the Academy Award for Best Foreign Language Film.

See also
 List of submissions to the 88th Academy Awards for Best Foreign Language Film
 List of Hungarian submissions for the Academy Award for Best Foreign Language Film
 List of Holocaust films

References

External links
 
 
 
 
 
 Official screenplay

2015 films
2015 directorial debut films
2015 drama films
2015 war drama films
2010s Hungarian-language films
Yiddish-language films
2010s German-language films
2010s Greek-language films
2010s Polish-language films
Hungarian drama films
Films about Nazism
Films set in Poland
Films set in 1944
Films shot in Budapest
Films directed by László Nemes
Holocaust films
Best Foreign Language Film Golden Globe winners
Independent Spirit Award for Best Foreign Film winners
Best Foreign Language Film Academy Award winners
Best Foreign Film Guldbagge Award winners
Best Foreign Language Film BAFTA Award winners
Cannes Grand Prix winners
2015 multilingual films
Hungarian multilingual films